Ben Schumann is an Australian actor, best known for his role as Ed Newman in the Fox8 teen drama series, SLiDE and also as Franco Galluzo in Holly's Heroes.

Filmography

References

External links

Living people
Australian male television actors
1989 births